Bernard Patrick Conroy (March 14, 1871 – November 25, 1937) was a professional baseball player. He played one season in Major League Baseball, primarily as an infielder.

As a nineteen-year-old, Conroy was the starting shortstop for the Philadelphia Athletics of the American Association in 1890, their last year of existence. He led the team in games played with 117.

External links

Major League Baseball shortstops
Philadelphia Athletics (AA) players
Dover (minor league baseball) players
Wilmington Peach Growers players
Lebanon Cedars players
Harrisburg Ponies players
Scranton Indians players
Allentown Colts players
Hazleton Barons players
Allentown Goobers players
Pottsville Colts players
Philadelphia Athletics (minor league) players
Shamokin Actives players
Reading Actives players
Pottsville Greys players
Shamokin Coal Heavers players
Reading Coal Heavers players
Baseball players from Philadelphia
1871 births
1937 deaths
19th-century baseball players